Brad Berkson (born February 26, 1963) is an American businessman and former government official who served as the Director of Cost Assessment and Program Evaluation in the United States Department of Defense. Berkson also served as the Acting Deputy Under Secretary of Defense for Logistics and Materiel Readiness, now termed Assistant Secretary of Defense for Sustainment. Berkson led Secretary of Defense Robert Gates' Intelligence, Surveillance, & Reconnaissance Task Force. Berkson served in the Bush Administration and remained in the Obama Administration until April, 2009.

Early life and education
Berkson was born in Gallup, New Mexico. He graduated from the University of Tulsa in 1985 with a B.S. in petroleum engineering and earned an MBA from Harvard Business School in 1991.

Career 
He was an engineer for Exxon Corporation who worked on the Prudhoe Bay field on Alaska's North Slope. After Harvard, Berkson joined McKinsey & Company, where he became a partner in 1997. After starting a company in 2000 which sold to N E W Customer Service Companies Inc six months later, he was named president at NEW.

In February 2003, Berkson joined the Office of the Secretary of Defense at the Pentagon. In 2004, he became the senior logistician for Secretary Donald Rumsfeld, a post now titled Assistant Secretary of Defense for Sustainment. In May 2005, Berkson was chosen by Rumsfeld to serve as Director of Program Analysis and Evaluation, a position retitled Director of Cost Assessment and Program Evaluation. He served in that post through the end of the Bush Administration and assisted Secretary Robert Gates throughout the transition to the Obama Administration until April 2009. During his last year at the Pentagon Secretary Robert Gates tapped Berkson to head his Intelligence, Surveillance, & Reconnaissance Task Force.

In April 2009, Berkson left the Pentagon. He joined several boards including Boeing Defense, Space & Security, DryFire, SecureNet, and GEM Mobile Treatment Services. He chaired both the National Defense Business Institute and CEVA Government Services, a subsidiary of CEVA Logistics. He left N12 in 2018 and became a senior advisor to various startups including Wheeli, a long-distance ride-sharing app, and SeatAssignMate.com, an interactive e-mail SaaS company.

Honors and awards
Berkson was awarded the Department of Defense Medal for Distinguished Public Service in 2009. That same year he was also named a Significant Sig by the Sigma Chi Fraternity.

References

United States Department of Defense officials
1963 births
Living people
George W. Bush administration personnel
New Mexico Republicans
McKinsey & Company people
Harvard Business School alumni
University of Tulsa alumni